Grace Denio Litchfield (November 19, 1849 – December 4, 1944) was an American poet and novelist. Her first pieces were three poems, which she sent out to three of the leading magazines. They all came back. They were sent out again and to the same set of magazines, but changed about. Again they were returned. The third trial was more successful and two of the poems were accepted. With what they brought the young writer started a little fund to place a memorial window to her mother in Grace Church, Brooklyn, the daughter feeling that the gift had a deeper meaning because "Only what one has earned is one's very own."

Early years and education
Grace Denio Litchfield was born in Brooklyn Heights in New York City on November 19, 1849. She was the youngest daughter of Grace Hill Litchfield and Edwin Litchfield, an attorney. Litchfield's sister, Francese Hubbard Litchfield Turnbull, of Baltimore, was the author of Val Maria and several other books.

Career

She wrote almost constantly, both in prose and verse, since early childhood, and in spite of much ill health. She did not begin to publish until 1882. Since that year, her verses and stories were published in many popular magazines of the day such as Harper's, the Century, The Atlantic, the St Nicholas, the Wide Awake, and the New York Independent.

All her novels were written during the six years which she spent in Europe. Her first book, Only an Incident, was published in 1883. The Knight of the Black Forest, was written on the spot where the scene was laid, in 1882, and published in 1884-85, first appearing as a serial in the Century. Only an Incident, was written two months later, and was brought out in February, 1884. Criss-Cross, written in 1883, was published in August, 1885. A Hard-Won Victory was begun in 1883, laid aside a year on account of illness, finished in 1886 and published in 1888. A fifth book, a reprint of short stories, under the title of Little Venice, appeared in September, 1890. Her sixth book, Little He and She, a child's story, written in the spring of 1888, was published in November, 1890.

Litchfield was in Mentone, on the Italian Riviera, when that portion of Italy was visited by the earthquake of February 23, 1887, and narrowly escaped death under the falling walls of her residence. Her account of the earthquake on the Riviera, In the Crucible, was published in 1897.

Personal life

Litchfield's home was in Brooklyn, but much of her life was passed in Europe. When she returned to the United States from a European trip, in 1888, she made her home in Washington, D. C., where she has built a house on 2010 Massachusetts Avenue Northwest, and lived for fifty years. She also kept a summer home on Central New York's Lake Minnewaska. Litchfield died in Goshen, New York on December 4, 1944.

Selected works

Only an Incident (1883) 
Criss-Cross (1885)
The Knight of the Black Forest (1885)
A Hard-won Victory (1888)
Little Venice and Other Stories (1890)
Little He and She (1893)
Mimosa Leaves: Poems (1895)
In the Crucible (1897)
The Moving Finger Writes (1900) 
Vita: a Drama (1904)
The Letter D (1904)
The Supreme Gift (1908)
Baldur the Beautiful (1910)
The Nun of Kent: a Drama in Five Acts (1911)
Collected Poems (1913) 
The Song of the Sirens (1917)
As a Man Sows and Other Stories (1926)

References

Bibliography

External links

 The Grace Denio Litchfield Collection at Johns Hopkins University
 
 

1944 deaths
1849 births
19th-century American novelists
19th-century American women writers
19th-century American short story writers
20th-century American novelists
20th-century American women writers
20th-century American poets
20th-century American short story writers
American women novelists
American women short story writers
American women poets
People from Brooklyn Heights
Writers from Brooklyn
Novelists from New York (state)
Wikipedia articles incorporating text from A Woman of the Century